Cedric Glenn Ball (born April 16, 1968) is a retired American professional basketball player born in Worcester, Massachusetts. He had a brief stint with the Los Angeles Clippers during the 1990–91 NBA season. Ball, a 6'8" (2.03 m) and 210 lb (95 kg) small forward, attended South High Community School in Worcester and the University of North Carolina at Charlotte.

Ball also played professionally in Japan, France and Venezuela.

He now works as an associate in the Probation Department at the Western Worcester District Court in East Brookfield, Worcester County, Massachusetts. He is also studying to become a deacon at his Baptist church.

Notes

External links 
 NBA stats @ www.basketballreference.com

1968 births
Living people
American expatriate basketball people in France
American expatriate basketball people in Japan
American expatriate basketball people in Venezuela
Basketball players from Worcester, Massachusetts
Los Angeles Clippers players
Charlotte 49ers men's basketball players
Connecticut Pride players
Quad City Thunder players
Small forwards
Undrafted National Basketball Association players
Wichita Falls Texans players
American men's basketball players